Claude Friese-Greene (3 May 1898 – 6 January 1943) was a British-born cinema technician, filmmaker and cinematographer, most famous for his 1926 collection of films entitled The Open Road.

Biography 

Claude, born Claude Harrison Greene in Fulham, London, was the son of William Friese-Greene, a pioneer in early cinematography. 
He was the grandfather of musician and music producer Tim Friese-Greene.

He died in Islington, London. He is buried in Highgate Cemetery with his parents.

Colour cinematography 
Claude's father William began the development of an additive colour film process called Biocolour. This process produced the illusion of true colour by exposing each alternate frame of ordinary black-and-white film stock through two different coloured filters. Each alternate frame of the monochrome print was then stained red or green. Although the projection of Biocolour prints did provide a tolerable illusion of true colour, like the more famous Kinemacolor process of George Albert Smith it suffered from noticeable colour flicker (a potentially headache-inducing defect known technically as 'colour bombardment') and from red-and-green fringing around anything in the scene that moved very rapidly. In an attempt to overcome these problems, a faster-than-usual frame rate was used.

After William's death in 1921, Claude Friese-Greene continued to develop the system during the 1920s and renamed the process Friese-Greene Natural Colour then the Spectrum Colour Film process. Claude went on to be a highly-respected cinematographer on more than 60 films from 1923 to 1943 and a was one of the first to shoot in Technicolor in Britain. He died as the result of an accident when filming at the Denham Film Studios in January 1943.

In 2006, the BBC ran a series of programmes called The Lost World of Friese-Greene. The series, presented by Dan Cruickshank, included The Open Road, Claude Friese-Greene's film of his 1920s road trip from Land's End to John o' Groats. The Open Road was filmed using the Spectrum Colour Film process, and the British Film Institute used computer processing of the images to minimise the red and green fringes around rapidly moving objects.

List of films in Spectrum Colour Film process
Dance of the Moods (1924) featuring modern dancer Margaret Morris
Moonbeam Magic (1924)
Quest of Colour (1924)
The Open Road (1924–1926) restored by the British Film Institute 2005

Selected filmography
 Moonbeam Magic (1924)
 Home at Last (1926)
 Tommy Atkins (1928)
 Widecombe Fair (1928)
 Under the Greenwood Tree (1929)
 A Romance of Seville (1929)
 Loose Ends (1930)
 The Middle Watch (1930)
 Uneasy Virtue (1931)
 The Flying Fool (1931)
 The Shadow Between (1931)
 Mr. Bill the Conqueror (1932)
 Fires of Fate (1932)
 For the Love of Mike (1932)
 A Southern Maid (1933)
 The Song You Gave Me (1933)
 Give Her a Ring (1934)
 Girls Will Be Boys (1934)
 The Luck of a Sailor (1934)
 Menace (1934)
 The Old Curiosity Shop (1934)
 No Monkey Business (1935)
 Music Hath Charms (1935)
 Invitation to the Waltz (1935)
 Drake of England (1935)
 Gypsy Melody (1936)
 Public Nuisance No. 1 (1936)
 Our Fighting Navy (1937)
 Star of the Circus (1938)
 Jane Steps Out (1938)
 Oh Boy! (1938)
 The Gang's All Here (1939)
 Murder in Soho (1939)
 Just like a Woman (1939)
 The Middle Watch (1940)
 The Flying Squad (1940)
 The Farmer's Wife (1941)
 Hard Steel (1942)
 The Great Mr. Handel (1942)
 Banana Ridge (1942)

See also
Color motion picture film
List of color film systems

References

External links
 CFG's colour footage of London
 

1898 births
1943 deaths
English inventors
Cinema pioneers
English cinematographers
Burials at Highgate Cemetery
Accidental deaths in England